Morecambe Football Club is a professional football club in Morecambe, Lancashire, England. The team competes in League One, the third tier of the English football league system.

Nicknamed "The Shrimps” due to the coastal town's local speciality food, the club have played home games at the Mazuma Stadium since moving from their original home at Christie Park in 2010. The club contests rivalries with nearby Accrington Stanley and formerly with non-league neighbours Lancaster City, along with other Lancashire clubs.

The club was founded in 1920 and entered into the Lancashire Combination, where they would remain for the next 48 years, winning the league title on five occasions: 1924–25, 1961–62, 1962–63, 1966–67 and 1967–68. They joined the newly formed Northern Premier League in 1968 and went on to win the FA Trophy in 1974 and the Northern Premier League President's Cup in 1992. Under the stewardship of Jim Harvey, a second-place finish in the 1994–95 Northern Premier League Premier Division season saw them promoted into the Conference. Having been beaten in the 2003 and 2006 play-off semi-finals, Sammy McIlroy led the club to promotion into the Football League with victory in the 2007 play-off Final. They finished in the top ten of League Two twice, reaching the play-off semi-finals after fourth-place finishes in 2009–10 and 2020–21; in the latter season they reached the 2021 League Two play-off Final and achieved a first promotion to League One.

History

1920–2005: Early history 
Football in the town dates back to the turn of the 20th century; however, it was not until 7 May 1920 that Morecambe FC was formed after a meeting at the local West View Hotel. The club then took its place in the Lancashire Combination League for the 1920–21 season.

Sharing grounds with Morecambe Cricket Club at Woodhill Lane during the first season, football proved popular, with crowds in excess of 3,000 for derby fixtures with Lancaster City and Fleetwood Town. Although success on the field was hard to come by, with the club languishing near the bottom of the table, at the end of the first season the club moved grounds to Roseberry Park. A few years later after the purchase of the ground by the then-President, J.B. Christie, the ground's name was changed to Christie Park in his honour. Those early seasons proved difficult, and it was not until 1924–25 that the club began to enjoy some success, claiming the league title for the first time; this was later followed by success in the Lancashire Junior Cup, beating old rivals Chorley after two replays, and in front of over 30,000 spectators.

Christie bequeathed the ground to the club in 1927 and also helped incorporate the club into a Limited Company with a then share capital of £1,000. The rest of the 1920s and the whole of the 1930s saw a constant struggle to keep football alive on the North West coast, with poor results on the field and little or no revenue off the field.

The post-war era saw an upturn in the Shrimps' fortunes with steady progress throughout the late 1940s and nearly all the 1950s, with a visible marked improvement when in 1956 Ken Horton was appointed player-manager. Whilst success was only just around the corner, the foundations for the future were being built. The Auxiliary Supporters club had been formed and with their help many ground improvements were undertaken, so that the on-field success dovetailed neatly with the off-field enterprise. The fourteen years from 1960 could justifiably be said to be Morecambe's Golden Era. This included an FA Cup third round appearance in 1961–62, a 1–0 defeat to Weymouth; a Lancashire Senior Cup Final victory in 1968, a 2–1 win over Burnley; and an FA Trophy success at Wembley in 1974, a 2–1 win over Dartford in the final.

The next 12 years were as barren as any previous period in the club's history. Attendances fell from a creditable 2,000 plus to a miserable 200 minus, with a visible decline in the club fortunes during that period. However, in 1985–86, signs of improvement appeared; the club's league position improved, and success in cups came as well over the next few years. It took ten years for the club to reach its ambition of promotion to the Football Conference after many further improvements, not only to the ground but also to the club's structure.

Since elevation to the Conference in season 1995–96, the Shrimps achieved status as one of the leading teams in the league. In fact, only Woking had a longer unbroken membership of the league at this time. Runners-up spot was claimed on one occasion and the play-offs places were narrowly missed twice. Also during this time, the club also equalled its best appearance in the FA Cup in both 2000–01 and 2002–03. On both occasions the club faced Ipswich Town, losing 3–0 and 4–0 respectively. Morecambe also defeated a few league clubs in the FA Cup, including Cambridge United in 2000–01 and Chesterfield in 2002–03.

2005–11: The Sammy McIlroy Era 
In November 2005, Jim Harvey suffered a heart attack during a league game at Christie Park against Cambridge United. The club quickly declared the appointment of a caretaker manager, Sammy McIlroy, a long-time friend of Harvey. After McIlroy's initial three-month stint as caretaker expired, he was given the job for the remainder of the season with Harvey expected to return on its closure. However, on his first day back as manager of Morecambe, Harvey was sacked by the club and McIlroy was appointed as permanent manager with Mark Lillis as his assistant. This caused a feud between long-time friends Harvey and McIlroy which has not been reconciled to this day.

In the absence of Harvey, Morecambe reached the Conference play-offs. They lost to Hereford 4–3 on aggregate, but McIlroy was appointed on a permanent basis in May 2006. The following season, Morecambe were promoted to the Football League for the first time in their history after winning the Conference Playoff Final, beating Exeter City 2–1 at Wembley on 20 May 2007, in front of over 40,000 fans which followed their semi-final victory over York City.

On 17 July 2007, Morecambe announced plans to move to a new stadium in time for the start of the 2009–10 season. Work did not commence on the proposed site until spring 2009, with an anticipated completion date of summer 2010.

Morecambe played their first game in the Football League against Barnet at Christie Park in August 2007, in which they played out a 0–0 draw to secure their first ever Football League point. On 14 August 2007, Morecambe played their first fixture in the League Cup and recorded a 2–1 win against near neighbours Preston North End at Deepdale with Jim Bentley and David Artell scoring for Morecambe. The Shrimps compounded this result with another upset win over a Championship side, a 3–1 win over Wolverhampton Wanderers on 28 August to advance into the third round of the League Cup, in which they faced a third consecutive Championship side, Sheffield United. However, Morecambe lost 5 goals to 0. They finished their first season in League Two in 11th place with 60 points. They also finished the 2008–09 season in 11th, this time with 63 points.

2009–10 was Morecambe's last season at Christie Park. They finished the season in fourth place, qualifying for the playoffs, where they lost 7–2 on aggregate to Dagenham & Redbridge.
On 10 August 2010, Morecambe played their first match at the Globe Arena against Championship side Coventry City in the League Cup First Round. Morecambe secured a 2–0 win, with Andy Fleming scoring the first two goals at the stadium. This earned Morecambe a Lancashire Derby in the second round against another Championship side, Burnley, where they lost 3–1. On 9 May 2011, Morecambe manager Sammy McIlroy left the club by mutual consent after five years at the helm. McIlroy, who took over as manager from Jim Harvey, had left the club alongside assistant Mark Lillis. Morecambe chairman Peter McGuigan praised the pair for their efforts since taking over, describing McIlroy as the "best manager in his reign at the club."

2011–19: The Jim Bentley Era
On 13 May 2011, Bentley was appointed manager on a two-year contract, signing a two-year deal as player-manager. His first game as a professional manager was a 1–0 defeat at home to Barnet. The Shrimps then went on a run of four wins in all competitions, including a 2–0 victory over Barnsley in the League Cup. After his first nine games in charge, Morecambe sat top of the league after winning six, drawing two and losing just once. Morecambe's defence at this time was crucial, conceding just five goals in nine games. However, this didn't last, as a poor end to the season led to Morecambe finishing 15th in League Two, still an improvement on the previous season. Jim Bentley's second season began with a 3–0 win over Exeter City. However, inconsistent performances once again resulted in them slipping into mid-table. During the 2016–17 season, Bentley received a two-match touchline ban and was fined £1,000, though Morecambe fans paid the fine.

2019–22: The Derek Adams Eras 
Bentley left the club in October 2019 to take the manager's role at AFC Fylde, having spent 16 months as the longest serving manager in the top four tiers of English football. In November 2019, Morecambe appointed Derek Adams as manager, signing him to a two-and-a-half year contract. The remainder of the season, shortened by the COVID-19 pandemic, saw the Shrimps finish 22nd after 37 games played, still enough to avoid relegation.

The 2020–21 season proved to be a banner year. Among other events, the season saw the club face two Premier League sides in various cup competitions, falling to Newcastle United in the third round of the EFL Cup and to Chelsea in the third round of the FA Cup at Stamford Bridge; the latter equaled their furthest run in the FA Cup since the early 2000s. The club also saw success in the league, qualifying for the League Two play-offs with 78 points, good enough for fourth in the league; they missed out on automatic promotion by a single point. Following a 3–2 aggregate win over Tranmere Rovers in the semi-final, the club confirmed a spot in the League Two play-off Final for the first time in their history, where they faced Newport County. On 31 May 2021, Morecambe beat Newport County 1–0 in the 2021 League Two play-off Final at Wembley Stadium after Carlos Mendes Gomes converted a penalty in the 107th minute, earning the Shrimps promotion to League One, the third tier of English football, for the first time in their history.

Adams resigned three days later, with the club stating that he had left "to pursue an opportunity elsewhere," which proved to be the managerial job at Bradford City.

In June 2021, the club announced that former Motherwell manager Stephen Robinson would take over as manager for the club's first season in League One. Their first game in League One was a 2–2 draw at Ipswich Town. Among the season's highlights, the club once again reached the third round of the FA Cup, and again faced a London-based Premier League side, this time Tottenham Hotspur; after scoring the first goal, Morecambe were ultimately undone in the last 15 minutes by goals from Harry Kane, Lucas Moura, and Harry Winks and fell 3–1 at Tottenham Hotspur Stadium.

However, with 32 games played in the season, Robinson left to take over at Scottish club St Mirren. Goalkeeping coach Barry Roche served a game as caretaker manager before Adams returned as manager on a deal lasting until June 2023. Despite the club flirting with relegation, Adams once again managed to lead them out of the drop zone, with the Shrimps finishing 19th and securing League One status for a second consecutive season.

In October 2022, Adams voiced worries about the future of the club; its owners, Bond Group Investments, had put the club up for sale in September 2022, with directors Jason Whittingham and Colin Goldring (both associated with the collapse of Worcester Warriors rugby union club) stepping down from the Shrimps' board.

Kit and main sponsors
Table of kit suppliers and shirt sponsors appear below: 
{| class="wikitable" style="text-align:center;margin-left:1em"
!Period
!Kit Manufacturer
!Shirt Sponsor
|-
|1920–74
|
|
|-
|1974–78
| Umbro
|
|-
|1978–79
|rowspan=2|Litesome
|
|-
|1979–80
| Holmark
|-
|1981–82
| Adidas
| Mitchells
|-
|-
|1983–84
| Umbro
|John Wilding
|-
|1984–85
|
| MG Markets
|-
|1985–86
|
|rowspan=3|Carlton Caterers
|-
|1986–87
| Umbro
|-
|1987–88
|
|-
|1988–91
| Umbro
| Cvg
|-
|1992–93
|
| Mitchells
|-
|1993–94
| Asics
| Carleton Inn
|-
|1994–95
|
| Printing Machinery
|-
|1995–96
|rowspan=4|Pony International
| Ais Products
|-
|1996–97
| Lakesway
|-
|1997–98
| Oasis
|-
|1998–99
| Ambulink UK
|-
|1999–2000
|rowspan=5|Umbro
| Redman & Jones
|-
|2000–02
| Business Serve PLC
|-
|2002–04
| Thurnham Leisure Group
|-
|2004–07
| Wright & Lord Solicitors
|-
|2007–08
| Jiang Print
|-
|2008–09
|rowspan=2|Puma SE
| Mopay.co.uk
|-
|2009–12
| Bench.
|-
|2012–13
|rowspan=3|Fila
| Carbrini
|-
|2013–14
| Blacks Leisure Group
|-
|2014–15
| Carbrini
|-
|2015–16
|rowspan=2|Carbrini
| JD Sports
|-
|2016–17
| Omega Holidays
|-
|2017–18
|rowspan=3|Macron
|rowspan=1|Purple Property Group
|-
|2018–19
|Bizloans4u
|-
|2019–21
|rowspan=1|Annapurna Recruitment
|-
|2021–
|rowspan=1|Joma
|rowspan=1|Mazuma
|-

Mascot
The Shrimps mascot is Christie the cat. The cat was named after Morecambe's old Stadium, Christie Park.  He once had an infamous friendly altercation with Dagenham & Redbridge goalkeeper Tony Roberts for which Christie was sent off, even though the dispute had been started by Roberts.

Christie is now a regular at The Globe Arena, having reappeared after being stolen following the last game at Christie Park. A member of the public came into the Globe and offered to sell Christie to the club, but a nice policeman explained to the member of the public that he would be going home empty handed, having been congratulated for his community spirit.

Rivalries
Starting in the early 1990s, Morecambe have been engaged in a bitter rivalry with Lancashire neighbours Accrington Stanley.  The Shrimps failed to beat Accrington in 16 attempts after their 2007 promotion to the Football League before Aaron Wildig's goal gave them a 1–0 win over their rivals in August 2015.
Morecambe's other local rivals include Barrow, Lancaster City, Fleetwood Town, Kendal Town and Southport.

Players

Current squad

Out on Loan

Morecambe U18s

Club staff

Club personnel

Managerial history
Since 1947 to present

Honours and achievements
League Two (4th tier)
Play-off winners (1): 2020–21

Conference National (5th tier)
Play-off winners (1): 2006–07

Northern Premier League (6th tier)
Runners-up and promoted (1): 1994–95

Lancashire Combination
Champions (5): 1924–25, 1961–62, 1962–63, 1966–67, 1967–68

FA Trophy
Winners (1): 1973–74

Conference League Cup
Winners (1): 1997–98

Northern Premier League President's Cup
Winners (1): 1991–92

Lancashire Senior Cup
Winners (1): 1967–68

Lancashire FA Challenge Trophy
Winners (11): 1925–26, 1926–27, 1961–62, 1962–63, 1968–69, 1985–86, 1986–7, 1993–94, 1995–96, 1998–99, 2003–04

Lancashire Combination Cup
Winners (5): 1926–27, 1945–46, 1964–65, 1966–67, 1967–68

Footnotes

References

 
Association football clubs established in 1920
1920 establishments in England
Football clubs in Lancashire
Football clubs in England
Sport in the City of Lancaster
Lancashire Combination
Northern Premier League clubs
National League (English football) clubs
English Football League clubs